The 2019 Belk Bowl was a college football bowl game played on December 31, 2019, with kickoff at 12:00 p.m. EST on ESPN. It was the 18th edition of the Belk Bowl, and was one of the 2019–20 bowl games concluding the 2019 FBS football season. The game was sponsored by department store chain Belk.

Teams
The game was played between the Virginia Tech Hokies from the Atlantic Coast Conference (ACC) and the Kentucky Wildcats from the Southeastern Conference (SEC). This was the 20th meeting between the programs; Kentucky entered the game leading the all-time series, 11–6–2.

Virginia Tech Hokies

Virginia Tech entered the bowl with an 8–4 record (5–3 in conference). They finished second in the ACC's Coastal Division. The Hokies were 1–1 against ranked FBS teams, defeating Wake Forest and losing to Notre Dame. This was Virginia Tech's second Belk Bowl; their 2016 team won that season's Belk Bowl over Arkansas, 35–24.

Kentucky Wildcats

Kentucky entered the bowl with a 7–5 record (3–5 in conference). They finished in the three-way tie for fourth place in the SEC's East Division. The Wildcats lost to both ranked FBS teams that they played, Florida and Georgia. This was Kentucky's first appearance in the Belk Bowl.

Game summary

Statistics

References

External links

Game statistics at statbroadcast.com

Belk Bowl
Duke's Mayo Bowl
Belk Bowl
Belk Bowl
Virginia Tech Hokies football bowl games
Kentucky Wildcats football bowl games